Netu Yukam, according to Ayyavazhi mythology, was a time when another fragment of Kroni was created into two wicked persons called Thillaimallalan and Mallosivahanan. They ruled over the people most wickedly by extracting Uliyam and Iraikal (taxes) from them. When it became unbearable, the Thevarkal (celestial beings) complained to Isvaran, who in turn commissioned Lord Narayana to carry out the destruction of the wicked rulers, which he later did.

See also

List of Ayyavazhi-related articles

Ayyavazhi mythology
Eight Yugas